District 42 is a district of the Georgia State Senate covering portions of DeKalb county including the county seat of Decatur, Atlanta, Avondale Estates.

Senators
 Elena Parent (2015–present)
 Jason Carter (2010–2015)
 David I. Adelman (2002–2010)
 Mike Polak (1998–2002)
 Mary Margaret Oliver (1996–1998)
 Pierre Howard (1980–1996)

DeKalb County, Georgia
Georgia Senate districts